Sunderland is a port city in Tyne and Wear, England. It is the City of Sunderland's administrative centre and in the historic county of Durham. It is the only other city in the county and the second largest settlement in the North East after Newcastle upon Tyne.

Locals from the city are sometimes known as Mackems. The term originated as recently as the early 1980s; its use and acceptance by residents, particularly among the older generations, is not universal. At one time, ships built on the Wear were called "Jamies", in contrast with those from the Tyne, which were known as "Geordies", although in the case of "Jamie" it is not known whether this was ever extended to people.

There were three original settlements by the River's mouth which are part of the modern-day city: Monkwearmouth, settled in 674 on the river's north bank with King Ecgfrith of Northumbria land granting to Benedict Biscop to found a monastery which, together with Jarrow monastery, later formed the dual Monkwearmouth-Jarrow Abbey; Sunderland, settled in 685; and Bishopwearmouth, founded in 930. The later two are on the Wear's southern bank. The second settlement on the wear's mouth grew as a fishing settlement and later as a port, being granted a town charter in 1179. The city started to trade coal and salt with ships starting to be built on the river in the 14th century. By the 19th century, with a population increase due to shipbuilding, port and docks, the town absorbed the other two settlements. Following the decline of its traditional industries in the late 20th century, the area became an automotive building centre. In 1992, the borough of Sunderland was granted city status.

Toponymy
In 685, King Ecgfrith granted Benedict Biscop a "sunder-land". Also in 685 The Venerable Bede moved to the newly founded Jarrow monastery. He had started his monastic career at Monkwearmouth monastery and later wrote that he was "ácenned on sundorlande þæs ylcan mynstres" (born in a separate land of this same monastery). This can be taken as "sundorlande" (being Old English for "separate land") or the settlement of Sunderland. Alternatively, it is possible that Sunderland was later named in honour of Bede's connections to the area by people familiar with this statement of his.

History

Early, ancient and Medieval

The earliest inhabitants of the Sunderland area were Stone Age hunter-gatherers and artifacts from this era have been discovered, including microliths found during excavations at St Peter's Church, Monkwearmouth. During the final phase of the Stone Age, the Neolithic period (c. 4000 – c. 2000 BC), Hastings Hill, on the western outskirts of Sunderland, was a focal point of activity and a place of burial and ritual significance. Evidence includes the former presence of a cursus monument.

It is believed the Brythonic-speaking Brigantes inhabited the area around the River Wear in pre-Roman Britain. There is a long-standing local legend that there was a Roman settlement on the south bank of the River Wear on what is the site of the former Vaux Brewery, although no archaeological investigation has taken place.

In March 2021, a "trove" of Roman artefacts were recovered in the River Wear at North Hylton, including four stone anchors, a discovery of huge significance that may affirm a persistent theory of a Roman Dam or Port existing at the River Wear.

Recorded settlements at the mouth of the Wear date to 674, when an Anglo-Saxon nobleman, Benedict Biscop, granted land by King Ecgfrith of Northumbria, founded the Wearmouth–Jarrow (St Peter's) monastery on the north bank of the river—an area that became known as Monkwearmouth. Biscop's monastery was the first built of stone in Northumbria. He employed glaziers from France and in doing he re-established glass making in Britain.
In 686 the community was taken over by Ceolfrid, and Wearmouth–Jarrow became a major centre of learning and knowledge in Anglo-Saxon England with a library of around 300 volumes.

The Codex Amiatinus, described by White as the 'finest book in the world', was created at the monastery and was likely worked on by Bede, who was born at Wearmouth in 673. This is one of the oldest monasteries still standing in England.  While at the monastery, Bede completed the Historia ecclesiastica gentis Anglorum (The Ecclesiastical History of the English People) in 731, a feat which earned him the title The father of English history.

In the late 8th century the Vikings raided the coast, and by the middle of the 9th century the monastery had been abandoned. Lands on the south side of the river were granted to the Bishop of Durham by Athelstan of England in 930; these became known as Bishopwearmouth and included settlements such as Ryhope which fall within the modern boundary of Sunderland.

In 1100, Bishopwearmouth parish included a fishing village at the southern mouth of the river (now the East End) known as 'Soender-land' (which evolved into 'Sunderland'). This settlement was granted a charter in 1179 by Hugh Pudsey, then the Bishop of Durham (who had quasi-monarchical power within the County Palatine); the charter gave its merchants the same rights as those of Newcastle-upon-Tyne, but it nevertheless took time for Sunderland to develop as a port. Fishing was the main commercial activity at the time: mainly herring in the 13th century, then salmon in the 14th and 15th centuries. From 1346 ships were being built at Wearmouth, by a merchant named Thomas Menville, and by 1396 a small amount of coal was being exported.

Jamies and Black Cats
Rapid growth of the port was prompted by the salt trade. Salt exports from Sunderland are recorded from as early as the 13th century, by 1589 salt pans were laid at Bishopwearmouth Panns (the modern-day name of the area the pans occupied is Pann's Bank, on the river bank between the city centre and the East End). Large vats of seawater were heated using coal; as the water evaporated, the salt remained. As coal was required to heat the salt pans, a coal mining community began to emerge. Only poor-quality coal was used in salt panning; better-quality coal was traded via the port, which subsequently began to grow.

Both salt and coal continued to be exported through the 17th century, with the coal trade growing significantly (2–3,000 tons of coal were exported from Sunderland in the year 1600; by 1680 this had increased to 180,000 tons). Difficulty for colliers trying to navigate the Wear’s shallow waters meant coal mined further inland was loaded onto keels (large, flat-bottomed boats) and taken downriver to the waiting colliers. A close-knit group of workers manned the Keels as 'keelmen'. In 1634 a market and yearly fair charter was granted by Bishop Thomas Morton, incorporated the settlement as a town.

Before the civil war and with the exclusion of Kingston upon Hull, the North declared for the King. In 1644 the North was captured by the Roundheads (Parliamentarians), the area itself taken in March of that year. One artifact of the civil war in the area was the long trench; a tactic of later warfare. In the village of Offerton roughly three miles inland from the present city centre, skirmishes occurred. The Roundheads blockaded the River Tyne, crippling the Newcastle coal trade, which allowed a short period of flourishing coal trade on the Wear.

In 1669, after the Restoration, King Charles II granted letters patent to one Edward Andrew, Esq. to 'build a pier and erect a lighthouse or lighthouses and cleanse the harbour of Sunderland'. They was a tonnage duty levy on shipping in order to raise the necessary funds. They was a growing number of shipbuilders or boatbuilders active on the River Wear in the late 17th century.

By the start of the 18th century the banks of the Wear were described as being studded with small shipyards, as far as the tide flowed. After 1717, measures having been taken to increase the depth of the river, Sunderland's shipbuilding trade grew substantially (in parallel with its coal exports). A number of warships were built, alongside many commercial sailing ships. By the middle of the century the town was probably the premier shipbuilding centre in Britain. By 1788 Sunderland was Britain's fourth largest port (by measure of tonnage) after London, Newcastle and Liverpool; among these it was the leading coal exporter (though it did not rival Newcastle in terms of home coal trade). Still further growth was driven across the region, towards the end of the century, by London's insatiable demand for coal during the French Revolutionary Wars.

In 1719, the parish of Sunderland was carved from the densely populated east end of Bishopwearmouth by the establishment of a new parish church, Holy Trinity Church, Sunderland (today also known as Sunderland Old Parish Church). Later, in 1769, St John's Church was built as a chapel of ease within Holy Trinity parish; built by a local coal fitter, John Thornhill, it stood in Prospect Row to the north-east of the parish church. (St John's was demolished in 1972.) By 1720 the port area was completely built up, with large houses and gardens facing the Town Moor and the sea, and labourers' dwellings vying with manufactories alongside the river. The three original settlements of Wearmouth (Bishopwearmouth, Monkwearmouth and Sunderland) had started to combine, driven by the success of the port of Sunderland, salt panning and shipbuilding along the banks of the river. Around this time, Sunderland was known as 'Sunderland-near-the-Sea'.

Sunderland's third-biggest export, after coal and salt, was glass. The town's first modern glassworks were established in the 1690s and the industry grew through the 17th century. Its flourishing was aided by trading ships bringing good-quality sand (as ballast) from the Baltic and elsewhere which, together with locally available limestone (and coal to fire the furnaces) was a key ingredient in the glassmaking process. Other industries that developed alongside the river included lime burning and pottery making (the town's first commercial pottery manufactory, the Garrison Pottery, had opened in old Sunderland in 1750).

By 1770 Sunderland had spread westwards along its High Street to join up with Bishopwearmouth. In 1796 Bishopwearmouth in turn gained a physical link with Monkwearmouth following the construction of a bridge, the Wearmouth Bridge, which was the world's second iron bridge (after the famous span at Ironbridge). It was built at the instigation of Rowland Burdon, the Member of Parliament (MP) for County Durham, and described by Nikolaus Pevsner as being 'a triumph of the new metallurgy and engineering ingenuity [...] of superb elegance'. At the time of building, it was the biggest single-span bridge in the world; and because Sunderland had developed on a plateau above the river, it never suffered from the problem of interrupting the passage of high-masted vessels.

During the War of Jenkins' Ear a pair of gun batteries were built (in 1742 and 1745) on the shoreline to the south of the South Pier, to defend the river from attack (a further battery was built on the cliff top in Roker, ten years later). One of the pair was washed away by the sea in 1780, but the other was expanded during the French Revolutionary Wars and became known as the Black Cat Battery. In 1794 Sunderland Barracks were built, behind the battery, close to what was then the tip of the headland.

The world's first steam dredger was built in Sunderland in 1796-7 and put to work on the river the following year. Designed by Stout's successor as Engineer, Jonathan Pickernell jr (in post from 1795 to 1804), it consisted of a set of 'bag and spoon' dredgers driven by a tailor-made 4-horsepower Boulton & Watt beam engine. Onshore, numerous small industries supported the business of the burgeoning port. In 1797 the world's first patent ropery (producing machine-made rope, rather than using a ropewalk) was built in Sunderland, using a steam-powered hemp-spinning machine which had been devised by a local schoolmaster, Richard Fothergill, in 1793; the ropery building still stands, in the Deptford area of the city.

"The greatest shipbuilding port in the world"

Sunderland's shipbuilding industry continued to grow through most of the 19th century, becoming the town's dominant industry and a defining part of its identity. By 1815 it was 'the leading shipbuilding port for wooden trading vessels' with 600 ships constructed that year across 31 different yards. By 1840 the town had 76 shipyards and between 1820 and 1850 the number of ships being built on the Wear increased fivefold. From 1846 to 1854 almost a third of the UK's ships were built in Sunderland, and in 1850 the Sunderland Herald proclaimed the town to be the greatest shipbuilding port in the world.

The Durham & Sunderland Railway Co. built a railway line across the Town Moor and established a passenger terminus there in 1836. In 1847 the line was bought by George Hudson's York and Newcastle Railway. Hudson, nicknamed 'The Railway King', was Member of Parliament for Sunderland and was already involved in a scheme to build a dock in the area. In 1846 he had formed the Sunderland Dock Company, which received parliamentary approval for the construction of a dock between the South Pier and Hendon Bay.

Increasing industrialisation had prompted residents an expansion away from the old port area in the suburban terraces of the Fawcett Estate and Mowbray Park. The area around Fawcett Street itself increasingly functioned as the civic and commercial town centre. 

Marine engineering works were established from the 1820s onwards, initially providing engines for paddle steamers; in 1845 a ship named Experiment was the first of many to be converted to steam screw propulsion. Demand for steam-powered vessels increased during the Crimean War; nonetheless, sailing ships continued to be built, including fast fully-rigged composite-built clippers, including the City of Adelaide in 1864 and Torrens (the last such vessel ever built), in 1875.

By the middle of the century glassmaking was at its height on Wearside. James Hartley & Co., established in Sunderland in 1836, grew to be the largest glassworks in the country and (having patented an innovative production technique for rolled plate glass) produced much of the glass used in the construction of the Crystal Palace in 1851. A third of all UK-manufactured plate glass was produced at Hartley's by this time. Other manufacturers included the Cornhill Flint Glassworks (established at Southwick in 1865), which went on to specialise in pressed glass, as did the Wear Flint Glassworks (which had originally been established in 1697). In addition to the plate glass and pressed glass manufacturers there were 16 bottle works on the Wear in the 1850s, with the capacity to produce between 60 and 70,000 bottles a day.

In 1848 George Hudson's York, Newcastle and Berwick Railway built a passenger terminus, Monkwearmouth Station, just north of Wearmouth Bridge; and south of the river another passenger terminus, in Fawcett Street, in 1853. Later, Thomas Elliot Harrison (chief engineer to the North Eastern Railway) made plans to carry the railway across the river; the Wearmouth Railway Bridge (reputedly 'the largest Hog-Back iron girder bridge in the world') opened in 1879.

In 1854 the Londonderry, Seaham & Sunderland Railway opened linking collieries to a separate set of staiths at Hudson Dock South, it also provided a passenger service from Sunderland to Seaham Harbour.

In 1886–90 a new Town Hall was built in Fawcett Street, just to the east of the railway station, designed by Brightwen Binyon. By 1889 two million tons of coal per year was passing through Hudson Dock,  while to the south of Hendon Dock, the Wear Fuel Works distilled coal tar to produce pitch, oil and other products.

The 20th century saw Sunderland A.F.C. established as the Wearside area's greatest claim to sporting fame. Founded in 1879 as Sunderland and District Teachers A.F.C. by schoolmaster James Allan, Sunderland joined The Football League for the 1890–91 season.

Mackem

From 1900 – 1919 an electric tram system was built and was gradually replaced by buses during the 1940s before being ended in 1954. In 1909 the Queen Alexandra Bridge was built, linking Deptford and Southwick.

The First World War increased shipbuilding, leading to being a target in a 1916 Zeppelin raid and  Monkwearmouth struck on 1 April 1916 and 22 people died. Over 25,000 men from a population of 151,000 served in the armed forces during the war.

Through the Great Depression of the 1930s, shipbuilding dramatically declined: shipyards on the Wear went from 15 in 1921 to six in 1937. The small yards of J. Blumer & Son (at North Dock) and the Sunderland Shipbuilding Co. Ltd. (at Hudson Dock) both closed in the 1920s, and other yards were closed down by National Shipbuilders Securities in the 1930s.

By 1936 the Sunderland AFC had been league champions on six occasions. They won their first FA Cup in 1937.

With the outbreak of World War II in 1939, Sunderland was a key target of the German Luftwaffe bombing, 267 people died and local industries destroyed. and damage or destruction to 4,000 homes. 

Many old buildings remain despite the bombing that occurred during World War II. Religious buildings include Holy Trinity Church, built in 1719 for an independent Sunderland, St Michael's Church, built as Bishopwearmouth Parish Church and now known as Sunderland Minster and St Peter's Church, Monkwearmouth, part of which dates from AD 674, and was the original monastery. St Andrew's Church, Roker, known as the "Cathedral of the Arts and Crafts Movement", contains work by William Morris, Ernest Gimson and Eric Gill. St Mary's Catholic Church is the earliest surviving Gothic revival church in the city. After the war, more housing was built and the town's boundaries expanded in 1967 when neighbouring Ryhope, Silksworth, Herrington, South Hylton and Castletown were incorporated. Sunderland AFC one their only post-World War II major honour in 1973 when they won a second FA Cup. 

Shipbuilding ended in 1988 and coal-mining in 1993 after a mid-1980s unemployment crisis with 20 per cent of the local workforce unemployed in the town.

Electronic, chemical, paper and motor manufacturing as well as the service sector expanded during the 1980s and 1990s to fill unemployment from heavy industry. In 1986 Japanese car manufacturer Nissan opened its Nissan Motor Manufacturing UK factory in Washington, which has since become the UK's largest car factory.

City status
Sunderland received city status in 1992. Like many cities, Sunderland comprises a number of areas with their own distinct histories, Fulwell, Monkwearmouth, Roker, and Southwick on the northern side of the Wear, and Bishopwearmouth and Hendon to the south. From 1990, the Wear’s riverbanks were regenerated with new housing, retail parks and business centres on former shipbuilding sites; the National Glass Centre, a new University of Sunderland campus on the St Peter's site were also built. The Vaux Breweries site was clear on the north west fringe of the city centre for further development opportunities in the city centre.

After 99 years at the historic Roker Park stadium, the club moved to the 42,000-seat Stadium of Light on the banks of the River Wear in 1997. At the time, it was the largest stadium built by an English football club since the 1920s, and has since been expanded to hold nearly 50,000 seated spectators.

On 24 March 2004, the city adopted Benedict Biscop as its patron saint. In 2018 the city was ranked as the best to live and work in the UK by the finance firm OneFamily. In the same year, the city was ranked as one of the top 10 safest in the UK.

The 1970 Sunderland Civic Centre closed in November 2021, following the opening of a new City Hall on the former Vaux Brewery redevelopment site.

Governance

Sunderland was created a municipal borough of County Durham in 1835. Under the Local Government Act 1888, it was given the status of a County Borough, independent from county council control. Sunderland has the motto of Nil Desperandum Auspice Deo or Under God's guidance we may never despair.

In 1974, under the Local Government Act 1972, the county borough was abolished and its area combined with that of other districts to form the Metropolitan Borough of Sunderland in Tyne and Wear metropolitan county. The Northumbria Police (covering Tyne and Wear and Northumberland) and Tyne and Wear Fire and Rescue Service (covering the county only) were also formed. 

In 1986, Tyne and Wear County Council was abolished, and Sunderland became a unitary authority in all but name, once again independent from county council control but still in the county with joint bodies such as a passenger transport executive covering the area. The metropolitan borough was granted city status after winning a competition in 1992 to celebrate the Queen's 40th year on the throne.

The council area's population (taken at the 2011 Census) was 275,506. Since 2014, the City of Sunderland has been a member of the North East Combined Authority; initially Tyne and Wear, Northumberland and the County Durham District. The Tyne and Wear Passenger Transport Executive, branded as Nexus, became an executive body of the North East Combined Authority. The combined authority split along the Tyne in 2018 with the borough remaining with Gateshead, South Tyneside and the County Durham District. The split may be resolved with talks to recombine the two combined authorities, including the County Durham district or (covering same area as the local police force) without the district.

Voting 
Sunderland voted for Brexit in the 2016 referendum on European Union membership by 61% of the vote; an unexpectedly high margin. The New Statesman and The Daily Telegraph have described Sunderland as the poster city for Brexit.

For decades, Sunderland has been an electoral stronghold of the Labour Party.  Sunderland is represented in the House of Commons in the Parliament of the United Kingdom by three Labour Members of Parliament; Bridget Phillipson since 2020, Julie Elliott since 2017 and Sharon Hodgson.

Geography

Much of the city is located on a low range of hills running parallel to the coast. On average, it is around 80 metres above sea level. Sunderland is divided by the River Wear which passes through the middle of the city in a deeply incised valley, part of which is known as the Hylton gorge. Several smaller bodies of water, such as Hendon Burn and the Barnes Burn, run through the suburbs. The three road bridges connecting the north and south portions of the city are the Queen Alexandra Bridge at Pallion, the Wearmouth Bridge just to the north of the city centre and most recently the Northern Spire Bridge between Castletown and Pallion. To the west of the city, the Hylton Viaduct carries the A19 dual-carriageway over the Wear (see map below).

The city possesses a number of public parks. Several of these are historic, including Mowbray Park, Roker Park and Barnes Park. In the early 2000s, Herrington Country Park was opened opposite Penshaw Monument. The city's parks have secured several awards for its commitment to preserving natural facilities, receiving the Britain in Bloom collective in 1993, 1997 and 2000.

Most of the suburbs of Sunderland are situated towards the west of the city centre with 70% of its population living on the south side of the river and 30% on the north side. The city extends to the seafront at Hendon and Ryhope in the south and Seaburn in the north.

Size
In the 2011 census, there were three definitions of Sunderland. The built-up area subdivision follows the boundaries of what is considered Sunderland itself; the built-up area, is also known as Wearside, including Chester-le-Street and third is the council area which is similar in size to Wearside, without Chester-le-Street. The latter two include other surrounding towns and villages, the most notable being the town of Washington.

Green belt

The city is bounded by the Tyne & Wear Green Belt, with its portion in much of its surrounding rural area of the borough. It is a part of the local development plan, of which its stated aims are as follows:

In the Sunderland borough boundary, as well as the aforementioned areas, landscape features and facilities such as much of the River Don and Wear basins, the George Washington Hotel Golf and Spa complex, Sharpley Golf Course, Herrington Country Park, Houghton Quarry and Penshaw Hill are within the green belt area.

Climate
Sunderland has a temperate oceanic climate (Köppen: Cfb). Its location in the rain shadow of the Pennines, as well as other mountain ranges to the west, such as those of the Lake District and southwestern Scotland, make Sunderland one of the least rainy cities of Northern England. The climate is heavily moderated by the adjacent North Sea, giving it cool summers, and winters that are mild considering its latitude. As a result, Sunderland's coastline is likely slightly milder given the more southerly position. Another relatively nearby weather station in Durham has warmer summer days and colder winter nights courtesy of its inland position.

Demography

At 3,874 hectares, Sunderland is the 45th largest  urban area in England by measure of area, with a population density of 45.88 people per hectare.

According to statistics based on the 2001 census, 60% of homes in the Sunderland metropolitan area are owner occupied, with an average household size of 2.4 people. Three percent of the homes have no permanent residents.

The most ethnically diverse ward of the city was the (now defunct) Thornholme area which had a population of 10,214 in 2001. This ward, which included Eden Vale, Thornhill, as well as parts of Hendon, Ashbrooke and the city centre, has long been the focus of Wearside's Bangladeshi community. In Thornholme, 89.4% are white (86.3% White British), 7.8% are Asian and 1.3% are mixed-race. Today, the Barnes ward, which contains part of former Thornholme ward, has the highest percentage (5.4%) of Bangladeshi residents in the city, with people of this ethnicity being the ward's only significant ethnic minority. The 2001 census also recorded a substantial concentration of Greek nationals, living mainly in Central and Thornholme wards. The least ethnically diverse wards are in the north of the city. The area of Castletown is made up of 99.3% white, 0.4% Asian and 0.2% mixed-race.

The Sunderland USD had a population of 174,286 in 2011 compared with 275,506 for the wider city. Both of these figures are a decrease compared with 2001 figures that showed the Sunderland USD had a population of 182,758 compared with 280,807 for the wider city.

In 2011, the Millfield ward, which contains the western half of the city centre, was the most ethnically diverse ward in Sunderland. Millfield is a multiracial area with large Indian and Bangladeshi communities, being the centre of Wearside's Bangladeshi community along with neighbouring Barnes. The ward's ethnicity was, in 2011, 76.4% White (73.5% White British), 17.6% Asian and 2.5% Black. Other wards with high ethnic minority populations include Hendon, Barnes, St Michael's and St Peter's. In 2011, the least ethnically diverse ward was the Northside suburb Redhill which was 99.0% White (98.3% White British), 0.3% Asian and 0.1% Black.

2021 census

Here is a table comparing Sunderland and the wider City of Sunderland Metropolitan Borough as well as North East England.

The Sunderland Urban Subdivision is made up of all the wards listed on the table on the right hand side. In the Sunderland Urban Subdivision, 6.6% of the population were from an ethnic minority group (non white British) compared with 5.2% in the surrounding borough. Sunderland is less ethnically diverse than Gateshead and South Shields, mainly because of many outlying suburbs to the south, north and west of the city such as St Chad's, Southwick and Fulwell which have very high White British populations. The Sunderland Central Parliament constituency largely omits these areas. However, in 2001, the Sunderland USD was 96.6% White British, so the ethnic minority population is increasing.

Religion
The area is part of the Anglican Diocese of Durham. It has been in the Roman Catholic Diocese of Hexham and Newcastle since the Catholic hierarchy was restored in 1850. The 2011 census recorded that 70.2% of the population identified as Christian, 1.32% as Muslim, 0.29% as Sikh, 0.22% as Hindu, 0.19% as Buddhist, 0.02% as Jewish, and 21.90% as having no religion.

The Stake Center for the Sunderland Stake of The Church of Jesus Christ of Latter-Day Saints is in Sunderland.

Jewish heritage in the city, once part of a thriving community, can be dated back to around 1750, when a number of Jewish merchants from across the UK and Europe settled in Sunderland, eventually forming a congregation in 1768. A rabbi from Holland was established in the city in 1790. After a rapid growth in numbers during the latter half of the nineteenth century, the Jewish community in Sunderland reached its height in the mid 1930s, when around 2,000 Jews were recorded to be living in the town. The community has been in slow decline since the mid-20th century. Many Sunderland Jews left for stronger Jewish communities in Britain, including Gateshead, or to Israel. The Jewish primary school, the Menorah School, closed in July 1983. The synagogue on Ryhope Road, opened in 1928, closed at the end of March 2006. (See also Jews and Judaism in North East England) The Jewish population of the Sunderland Metropolitan Borough is continually diminishing, as the Jewish population fell from 114 people in 2001, to 76 people in 2011.

In 1998, following the grant of City status to Sunderland, the erstwhile parish church of Bishopwearmouth (St Michael's) was redesignated as Sunderland Minster with a city-wide role. It was believed to have been the first creation of a minster church in England since the Reformation.

Pentecostalism
The Reverend Alexander Boddy (1854–1930) was appointed vicar of All Saints' Church, Monkwearmouth in 1884.  During his ministry at Monkwearmouth, Boddy was influenced by the 1904–1905 Welsh revival and also by the British-born Norwegian preacher Thomas Ball Barratt. In the early years of the 20th century All Saints, Monkwearmouth became an important centre for the development of the Pentecostal Movement in Britain.

Economy

Regeneration
Since the mid-1980s Sunderland has undergone massive regeneration, particularly around the City Centre and the river corridor, following the industrial decline of the 1970s and early 1980s.

In the mid-1980s, Sunderland's economic situation began to improve following the collapse of the local shipbuilding industry. Japanese car manufacturer Nissan opened the Nissan Motor Manufacturing UK factory in 1986, and the first Nissan Bluebird car was produced later that year. The factory and its supplier companies remain the largest employers in the region, with current cars produced there including the Nissan Qashqai, the Nissan Juke and the electric Nissan LEAF. As of 2012 over 500,000 cars are produced annually, and it is the UK's largest car factory.

Also in the late 1980s, new service industries moved into sites such as the Doxford International Business Park in the south west of the city, attracting national and international companies. Sunderland was named in the shortlist of the top seven "intelligent cities" in the world for the use of information technology, in 2004 and 2005.

The former shipyards along the Wear were transformed with a mixture of residential, commercial and leisure facilities including St Peter's Campus of the University of Sunderland, University accommodation along the Fish Quay on the South side of the river, the North Haven housing and marina development, the National Glass Centre, the Stadium of Light and Hylton Riverside Retail Park. Also in 2007, the Echo 24 luxury apartments opened on Pann's Bank overlooking the river. In 2008 the Sunderland Aquatic Centre opened adjacent to the Stadium of Light, containing the only Olympic-size swimming pool between Leeds and Edinburgh. In 2000, the Bridges shopping centre was extended towards Crowtree Road and the former Central Bus Station, attracting national chain stores. This was followed by adjacent redevelopments on Park Lane.

Sunderland Corporation's massive post-war housing estate developments at Farringdon, Pennywell and Grindon have all passed into the ownership of Gentoo Group (previously 'Sunderland Housing Group'), a private company and a Registered Social Landlord.

Sunderland A.F.C. has been a major symbol of the area and a contributor to the local economy since the late 19th century. The club was one of the most successful and best supported clubs in the English game during this era, with its home at Roker Park holding more than 70,000 spectators at its peak. However, the FA Cup triumph of 1973 would prove to be the club's only postwar major trophy to date, and after its relegation in 1958 the club frequently bounced between the top two divisions of English football, and in 1987 and again in 2018 suffered relegation to the third tier of English football. The club played at Roker Park for 99 years until the completion of the new Stadium of Light at Monkwearmouth on the banks of the River Wear in 1997. The new stadium seated more than 42,000 on its completion, and has since been expanded to hold some 49,000 spectators. Sunderland's relatively high attendances have been a major boost to the local economy – averaging at more than 30,000 even during the club's current spell in the third tier of English football.

In 2004, redevelopment work began in the Sunniside area in the east-end of the city centre, including a multiplex cinema, a multi-storey car park, restaurants, a casino and tenpin bowling. Originally the River Quarter, the site was renamed Limelight in 2005, and renamed in 2008, when it became Sunniside Leisure. Sunniside Gardens were landscaped, and a number of new cafes, bars and restaurants were opened. Up-market residential apartments were developed, including the Echo 24 building.

Sunderland City Council's Unitary Development Plan (UDP) outlines ambitious regeneration plans for a number of sites around the city. The plans are supported by Sunderland Arc, an urban regeneration company funded by the City council, One NorthEast and the Homes and Communities Agency.

Vaux and Farringdon Row
Following the closure of the Vaux brewery in 1999, a  brownfield site lay dormant in the centre of Sunderland. The land was subject to dispute between supermarket chain Tesco, who bought the site in 2001, and Sunderland arc, who submitted plans for its redevelopment in 2002. During formal negotiations, Tesco stated they would be willing to sell the land to arc, if an alternative city centre site could be found. Possibilities include Holmeside Triangle, and the Sunderland Retail Park in Roker. Arc originally hoped to begin development in 2010. Arc's plans for the site were approved by the Secretary of State in 2007, and included extensive office space, hotels, leisure and retail units, residential apartments and a new £50 m Crown and Magistrates' court, along with a central public arcade located under an expansive glass canopy. It was hoped an "evening economy" could be encouraged, to complement the city's nightlife. In 2013 in the area opposite the Vaux site, Sunderland City Council announced the Keel Square project, a new public space designed to commemorate Sunderand's maritime heritage, which was completed in May 2015. Construction commenced in 2014.
Stadium Village
Redevelopment of the Monkwearmouth Colliery site, which sits on the north bank of the river Wear opposite the Vaux site, began in the mid-1990s with the creation of the Stadium of Light. In 2008, it was joined by the Sunderland Aquatic Centre. The Sheepfolds industrial estate occupies a large area of land between the Stadium and the Wearmouth Bridge. Sunderland Arc were in the process of purchasing land in the Sheepfolds, with a view to relocate the businesses and redevelop the site. The emphasis of development plans included further sporting facilities, in order to create a Sports Village. Other plans included a hotel, residential accommodation, and a footbridge linking the site with the Vaux development.

Grove and Transport Corridor
The Sunderland Strategic Transport Corridor (SSTC) is a proposed transport link from the A19, through the city centre, to the port. A major phase of the plan was the creation of a new bridge, the Northern Spire Bridge, which links the A1231 Wessington Way on the north of the river with the Grove site in Pallion, on the south of the river.
In 2008, Sunderland City Council offered the residents of Sunderland the opportunity to vote on the design of the bridge. The choices were a  iconic cable-stayed bridge, which would result in a temporary increase in council tax, or a simple box structure which would be within the council's budget.
The results of the consultation were inconclusive, with residents keen to have an iconic bridge, but reluctant to have a subsequent increase in tax to fund it.
Regardless of the ultimate design of the new bridge, the landing point will be the former Grove Cranes site in Pallion. Plans for this site focus around the creation of a new residential area, with homes, community buildings, commercial and retail space.

The Port
The Port of Sunderland, owned by the city council, has been earmarked for medium-term redevelopment with a focus on mixed-use industry.

Ship building and coal mining

Once hailed as the "Largest Shipbuilding Town in the World", ships were built on the Wear from at least 1346 onwards and by the mid-18th century Sunderland was one of the chief shipbuilding towns in the country. Sunderland Docks was the home of operations for the shipbuilding industry on Wearside. The Port of Sunderland was significantly expanded in the 1850s with the construction of Hudson Dock to designs by River Wear Commissioner's Engineer John Murray, with consultancy by Robert Stephenson. One famous vessel was the Torrens, the clipper in which Joseph Conrad sailed, and on which he began his first novel. She was one of the most famous ships of her time and can claim to be the finest ship ever launched from a Sunderland yard. 

Between 1939 and 1945 the Wear yards launched 245 merchant ships totalling 1.5 million tons, a quarter of the merchant tonnage produced in the UK at this period. Competition from overseas caused a downturn in demand for Sunderland built ships toward the end of the 20th century. The last shipyard in Sunderland closed on 7 December 1988.

Sunderland, part of the Durham coalfield, has a coal-mining heritage that dates back centuries. At its peak in 1923, 170,000 miners were employed in County Durham alone, as labourers from all over Britain, including many from Scotland and Ireland, entered the region. As demand for coal slipped following World War II, mines began to close across the region, causing mass unemployment. The last coal mine closed in 1994. The site of the last coal mine, Wearmouth Colliery, is now occupied by the Stadium of Light, and a miner's Davy lamp monument stands outside of the ground to honour the site's mining heritage. Documentation relating to the region's coalmining heritage are stored at the North East England Mining Archive and Resource Centre (NEEMARC).

Other industry

As with the coal-mining and shipbuilding, overseas competition has forced the closure of all of Sunderland's glass-making factories. Corning Glass Works, in Sunderland for 120 years, closed on 31 March 2007 and in January 2007, the Pyrex manufacturing site also closed, bringing to an end commercial glass-making in the city. However, there has been a modest rejuvenation with the opening of the National Glass Centre which, amongst other things, provides international glass makers with working facilities and a shop to showcase their work, predominantly in the artistic rather than functional field.

Vaux Breweries was established in the town centre in the 1880s and for 110 years was a major employer. Following a series of consolidations in the British Brewing industry, however, the brewery was finally closed in July 1999.  Vaux in Sunderland and Wards in Sheffield had been part of the Vaux Group, but with the closure of both breweries it was re-branded The Swallow Group, concentrating on the hotel side of the business. This was subject to a successful take-over by Whitbread PLC in the autumn of 2000. It is now a brownfield site and this is a derelict site in an urban area.

In 1855, John Candlish opened a bottleworks, producing glass bottles, with 6 sites at nearby Seaham and at Diamond Hall, Sunderland.

Education

Sunderland Polytechnic was founded in 1969, becoming the University of Sunderland in 1992. The institution currently has over 17,000 students. The university is split into two campuses; the City Campus (site of the original Polytechnic) is just to the west of the city centre, as is the main university library and the main administrative buildings. The 'Award-Winning' St Peter's Riverside Campus is located on the north banks of the river Wear, next to the National Glass Centre and houses the School of Business, Law and Psychology, as well as Computing and Technology and The Media Centre. The University of Sunderland was named the top university in England for providing the best student experience by The Times Higher Education Supplement (THES) in 2006. Since 2001 Sunderland has been named the best new university in England by The Guardian and Government performance indicators showed Sunderland as the best new university in England for the quality, range and quantity of its research.

Sunderland College is a further education establishment with campuses located at the Bede centre on Durham Road, Hylton, Doxford International Business Park and 'Phoenix House' in the city centre. It has over 14,000 students, and based on exam results is one of the most successful colleges. St Peter's Sixth Form College, next to St Peter's Church and the University, opened in September 2008. The college is a partnership between the three Sunderland North schools and City of Sunderland College.

There are eighteen secondary schools in the Sunderland area, predominantly comprehensives. According to exam results, the most successful was St Robert of Newminster Catholic School, a coeducational secondary school and sixth form in Washington. However, comprehensive schools also thrive, notably the Roman Catholic single-sex schools St Anthony's (for girls) and St Aidan's (for boys). Both continue to attain high exam results. 

There are seventy-six primary schools in Sunderland. According to the 'Value Added' measure, the most successful is Mill Hill Primary School, in Doxford Park.

Transport

Metro and rail

In May 2002, the Tyne and Wear Metro was extended to Sunderland in an official ceremony attended by The Queen, 22 years after it originally opened in Newcastle upon Tyne. The Green line now stretches deeper into South Tyneside and into Sunderland; it incorporates Seaburn, Millfield, Pallion, as well as Sunderland's mainline railway station and stations at the Park Lane Transport Interchange and both campuses of the University of Sunderland, before terminating at South Hylton. The trains run every 12–15 minutes, depending on the time of day, and call at all stations. All-zones Metro tickets cost £5.20 for a daily and £22.40 for a weekly, as of October 2019.

In March 2014, Metro owner Nexus proposed an extension of the network by the creation of an 'on-street' tram link which would connect the city centre to South Shields to the north and Doxford Park to the west.

Sunderland station opened in 1879 but was completely redesigned to facilitate football teams and officials from countries who were drawn to play at Roker Park during England's hosting of the 1966 World Cup. It is situated on an underground level. It was renovated in 2005, backed by the artistic team which designed the stations along the Wearside extension of the Tyne & Wear Metro in 2002. These services run hourly in each direction, cut from half-hourly on 12 December 2005 (but towards Newcastle there is also the option of taking the Metro – see the Metro subsection above).

The services were withdrawn due to a change of franchise which saw the First TransPennine Express route gain a franchise in its own right, distinct from the Regional Railways network which Arriva had inherited.

In 2006, Grand Central announced plans to operate a direct service between Sunderland and London King's Cross via York, a service which had been stripped from Wearside twenty years earlier. A scaled-down service of one train each day began in December 2007, twelve months after the initial launch date, due to delays caused by restoring rolling stock and a protracted court case against GNER (which Grand Central won). The service increased to three departures daily each way on 1 March 2008, connecting a line which can run from Edinburgh to London. The service has proved so popular that daily fourth and fifth direct trains are now in operation.

When Virgin Trains East Coast were announced as the winners of the InterCity East Coast franchise in November 2014, their plans included a daily service from Sunderland to London Kings Cross that commenced in December 2015.

Roads and buses

The fastest, largest and busiest road is the A19, which is a dual carriageway running north-to-south along the western edge of the urban area, crossing the River Wear at Hylton, and providing access north to the Tyne Tunnel, joining up with the A1 to Edinburgh, and south through Teesside, joining up with the A1M via the A168 at Thirsk, providing an entirely grade separated connection between Sunderland and the M1 motorway. The A19 originally ran through Sunderland city centre until the bypass was built in the 1970s; this route is now the A1018.

There are four main roads which support the city centre:

The A690 Durham Road terminates in the city centre and runs to Crook, County Durham via the city of Durham.

The A1231 (Sunderland Highway) begins in the city centre, crosses the Queen Alexandra Bridge and runs west through Washington to the A1. Most of this road is national speed limit dual carriageway.

The A1018 and A183 roads both start in the centre of South Shields and enter Sunderland from the north, before merging to cross the Wearmouth Bridge. The A1018 follows a direct route from Shields to Sunderland, the A183 follows the coast. After crossing the bridge, the A1018 follows a relatively straight path to the south of Sunderland where it merges with the A19. The A183 becomes Chester Road and heads west out of the city to the A1 at Chester-le-Street.

In Autumn 2007, the Southern Radial Route was opened. This is a bypass of the A1018 through Grangetown and Ryhope – a stretch that commonly suffered from congestion, especially during rush hour. The bypass starts just south of Ryhope, and runs parallel to the cliff tops into Hendon, largely avoiding residential areas.

The Sunderland strategic transport corridor project is an ongoing investment to the city's road infrastructure. The scheme will improve transport links around the city ensuring continuous dual carriageway between the A19 road and the port of Sunderland. The scheme also includes the building of a new wear bridge between Pallion on the south embankment and Castletown to the north.

A multimillion-pound transport interchange at Park Lane was opened on 2 May 1999 by the then Brookside actor Michael Starke. With 750,000 passengers per year, it is the busiest bus and coach station in Britain after Victoria Coach Station in Central London and has won several awards for innovative design. The majority of bus services in Sunderland are provided by Stagecoach in Sunderland and Go North East, with a handful of services provided by Arriva North East. Besides these, there are also cross-country and inter-city route buses mainly operated by National Express and Megabus. A new Metro station was built underneath the bus concourse to provide a direct interchange as part of the extension to South Hylton in 2002.

Cycling
There are a number of cycle routes that run through and around Sunderland. The National Cycle Network National Route 1 runs from Ryhope in the south, through the centre of the city and then along the coast towards South Shields. Britain's most popular long-distance cycle route – The 'C2C' Sea to Sea Cycle Route – traditionally starts or ends when the cyclist dips their wheel in the sea on Roker beach. The 'W2W' 'Wear-to-Walney' route and the 'Two-Rivers' (Tyne and Wear) route also terminate in Sunderland.

Airports and the port
Newcastle Airport is a 55-minute Metro ride from Sunderland city centre; there is a Metro train connecting with the airport every 12–15minutes in both directions until about 11pm, Monday-Sunday. Teesside International Airport can be reached in less than one hour by car. Each year on the last weekend in July, the city hosted the Sunderland International Airshow. It took place primarily along the sea front at Roker and Seaburn.

The Port of Sunderland is the second largest municipally-owned port in the United Kingdom. 
The port offers a total of 17 quays, which handle cargoes including forest products, non-ferrous metals, steel, aggregates and refined oil products, limestone, chemicals and maritime cranes. It also handles offshore supply vessels and has ship repair and drydocking facilities.

The river berths are deepwater and tidal, while the South Docks are entered via a lock with an  beam restriction.

Culture

Dialect and accent

The dialect of Sunderland is known as Mackem, and contains a large amount of vocabulary and distinctive words and pronunciations not used in other parts of the United Kingdom. The Mackem dialect has much of its origins in the language spoken by the Anglo-Saxon population. Although the accent has much in common with Geordie, the dialect spoken in Newcastle, there are some distinctive differences.

A few Sunderland dialect words:
Nee – No
Bosh – Problem
Marra – Mate
Ha'way – Come on (Not to be confused with Geordie's Howay)
Knack – Hurt
Git – Very (Used to emphasize something so 'very good' becomes 'git good')
Claes – Clothes

Attractions and events

Notable attractions for visitors to Sunderland include the 14th century Hylton Castle and the beaches of Roker and Seaburn. The National Glass Centre opened in 1998, reflecting Sunderland's distinguished history of glass-making.

Sunderland Museum and Winter Gardens, on Borough Road, was the first municipally funded museum in the country outside London. It houses a comprehensive collection of the locally produced Sunderland Lustreware pottery. The City Library Arts Centre, on Fawcett Street, housed the Northern Gallery for Contemporary Art until the library was closed in January 2017.  The library service was relocated to the Museum and Winter Gardens and the Gallery for Contemporary Art transferred to Sunderland University.

Every year the city hosts a large Remembrance Day memorial service, the largest in the UK outside London in 2006.

Sunderland celebrates an annual Restaurant week, where city centre restaurants provide some of the best plates at low costs.

Literature and art

Lewis Carroll was a frequent visitor to the area. He wrote most of Jabberwocky at Whitburn as well as "The Walrus and the Carpenter". Some parts of the area are also widely believed to be the inspiration for his Alice in Wonderland stories, such as Hylton Castle and Backhouse Park. There is a statue to Carroll in Whitburn library. Lewis Carroll was also a visitor to the Rectory of Holy Trinity Church, Southwick; then a township independent of Sunderland. Carroll's connection with Sunderland, and the area's history, is documented in Bryan Talbot's 2007 graphic novel Alice in Sunderland. More recently, Sunderland-born Terry Deary, writer of the series of Horrible Histories books, has achieved fame and success, and many others such as thriller writer Sheila Quigley, are following his lead.

The Salford-born painter L. S. Lowry was a frequent visitor, staying in the Seaburn Hotel in Sunderland. Many of his paintings of seascapes and shipbuilding are based on Wearside scenes. The Northern Gallery for Contemporary Art on Fawcett Street and Sunderland Museum and Winter Gardens showcase exhibitions and installations from up-and-coming and established artists alike, with the latter holding an extensive collection of Lowry. The National Glass Centre on Liberty Way also exhibits a number of glass sculptures.

Media, film and television
Sunderland has two local newspapers: the daily evening tabloid The Sunderland Echo, founded in 1873, and the Sunderland Star – a free newspaper.

It also has its own commercial station, Sun FM, formerly an independent station but now owned by Nation Broadcasting who acquired the station from the UKRD Group, a student-led community radio station, Spark, and a hospital radio station – Radio Sunderland for Hospitals, and can receive other north-eastern independent radio stations Metro Radio, Greatest Hits Radio North East, Capital North East, Smooth North East and Heart North East. The regional BBC radio station is BBC Radio Newcastle. The city is covered by BBC North East and Cumbria and ITV's Tyne Tees franchise, which has a regional office in the university's media centre.

Sunderland's inaugural film festival took place in December 2003 at the Bonded Warehouse building on Sunderland riverside, in spite of the lack of any cinema facilities in the city at that time, featuring the films of local and aspiring directors as well as re-showings of acclaimed works, such as Alan Bleasdale's The Monocled Mutineer, accompanied by analysis. By the time of the second festival commencing on 21 January 2005, a new cinema multiplex had opened in Sunderland to provide a venue which allowed the festival to showcase over twenty films.

Music, dance and kites

Sunderland musicians that have gone on to reach international fame include Dave Stewart of the Eurythmics and all four members of Kenickie, whose vocalist Lauren Laverne later became known as a TV presenter. In recent years, the underground music scene in Sunderland has helped promote the likes of Frankie & the Heartstrings, The Futureheads, The Golden Virgins and Field Music.

Other Mackem musicians include punk rockers The Toy Dolls ("Nellie the Elephant", December 1984), oi! punk band Red Alert, punk band Leatherface, the lead singer of dance outfit Olive, Ruth Ann Boyle ("You're Not Alone", May 1997) and A Tribe of Toffs ("John Kettley is a Weatherman", December 1988).

In May 2005, Sunderland played host to BBC Radio 1's Big Weekend concert at Herrington Country Park, attended by 30,000 visitors and which featured Foo Fighters, Kasabian, KT Tunstall, Chemical Brothers and The Black Eyed Peas.

The Sunderland Stadium of Light, home to Sunderland AFC, is recognised internationally as a major stadium concert venue. Headlining acts have included Oasis, Take That, Pink, Kings of Leon, Red Hot Chili Peppers, Coldplay, Bruce Springsteen and the E Street Band, Bon Jovi, Rihanna, One Direction, Foo Fighters and Beyonce. The Empire Theatre sometimes plays host to music acts. Independent, a city-centre nightclub/music venue, satisfies underground music lovers.

The Manor Quay' the students' union nightclub on St Peter's Riverside at the University of Sunderland, has also hosted the Arctic Monkeys, Maxïmo Park, 911, the Levellers and Girls Aloud. In 2009, the club was taken into private ownership under the name Campus and hosted N-Dubz, Ocean Colour Scene, Little Boots, Gary Numan and Showaddywaddy but has since been returned to the university. The former students' union Wearmouth Hall hosted Voice of the Beehive, Manic Street Preachers, The Primitives and Radiohead before closing in 1992.

Since 2009, Sunderland: Live in the City has played host to a series of free and ticketed live music events throughout venues in the city centre.

In 2013, local band Frankie and The Heartstrings opened a temporary pop up record store in the city, Pop Recs Ltd. Initially only intended to remain open for a fortnight, the store remains open and has hosted live performances from acts including The Cribs, The Vaccines and The Charlatans.

Sunderland also hosts the free International Festival of Kites, Music and Dance, which attracts kite-makers from around the world to Northumbria Playing Fields, Washington.

Theatre

The Sunderland Empire Theatre opened in 1907 on High Street West in the city centre. It is the largest theatre in between Edinburgh and London, and completed a comprehensive refurbishment in 2004. Operated by international entertainment group Live Nation, the Empire is the only theatre between Glasgow and Leeds with sufficient capacity to accommodate large West End productions. It is where British comic actor Sid James who died of a heart attack whilst on stage in 1976.

The Royalty Theatre on Chester Road is the home to the amateur Royalty Theatre Group who also put on a number of low-budget productions throughout the year. Film producer David Parfitt belonged to this company and is now a patron of the theatre.

The Sunniside area plays host to a number of smaller theatrical workshops and production houses, as well as the Theatre Restaurant, which combines a dining experience with a rolling programme of musical theatre.

Twin towns and sister cities

Sunderland is twinned with:
Harbin, China
Saint-Nazaire, France
Washington, D.C., United States
Essen, Germany

Sunderland is the only city that is not a capital of country twinned with Washington, D.C., as it includes the town of Washington, the ancestral home of George Washington's family.

Sport

The only professional sporting team in Sunderland is the football team, Sunderland A.F.C.,  and was elected to the Football League in 1890. Sunderland supporters are one of the oldest fan bases in England, and in 2019 it was reported that despite being in League One, Sunderland's average gates were higher than those of such teams as Lyon, Napoli, Roma, Valencia, Juventus, and Porto. After relegations from the FA Premier League and the EFL Championship, the club has played four consecutive seasons in EFL League One, but will again play in the EFL Championship in the 2022-23 season following their promotion in 2021-22. It is based at the 49,000-seat Stadium of Light, which was opened in 1997. Sunderland A.F.C also has the north-east's top women's football team, Sunderland A.F.C. Women, They currently play in the 3rd tier of English women's football – FA Women's National League North. Despite their financial struggles, Sunderland were league champions six times within the Football League's first half century, but have not achieved this accolade since 1936. Their other notable successes include FA Cup glory in 1937 and 1973 and winning the Division One title with a (then) English league record of 105 points in 1999.

Sunderland AFC's longest stadium occupancy so far was of Roker Park for 99 years beginning in 1898, with relocation taking place due to the stadium's confined location and the need to build an all-seater stadium. The initial relocation plan, announced in the early 1990s, had been for a stadium to be situated alongside the Nissan factory, but these were abandoned in favour of the Stadium of Light at Monkwearmouth on the site of a colliery on the banks of the River Wear that had closed at the end of 1993. The city also has three non-league sides, Sunderland Ryhope Community Association F.C., and Ryhope Colliery Welfare F.C., both of the Northern League Division One as well as Sunderland West End FC of the Wearside League, who play at the Ford Quarry Complex.

Sunderland's amateur Rugby and Cricket clubs are both based in Ashbrooke. The Ashbrooke ground was opened on 30 May 1887.

The Crowtree Leisure Centre has also played host to a number of important boxing matches and snooker championships including the 2003 Snooker World Trickshot and Premier League Final. In September 2005, BBC TV cameras captured international boxing bouts featuring local boxers David Dolan, Stuart Kennedy and Tony Jeffries. The latter became Sunderland's first Olympic medallist when he won a bronze medal in the light heavyweight boxing category for Great Britain and Northern Ireland at the 2008 Beijing Olympic Games.

On 18 April 2008, the Sunderland Aquatic Centre was opened. Constructed at a cost of £20 million, it is the only Olympic sized 50 m pool between Leeds and Edinburgh and has six diving boards, which stand at 1 m, 3 m and 5 m.

Athletics is also a popular sport in the city, with Sunderland Harriers Athletics Club based at Silksworth Sports Complex. 800 m runner Gavin Massingham represented the club at the AAA Championships in 2005. On 25 June 2006, the first Great Women's Run took place along Sunderland's coastline. Among the field which lined up to start the race were Olympic silver medallists Sonia O'Sullivan of the Republic of Ireland and Gete Wami of Ethiopia, who eventually won the race. The race quickly became an annual fixture in the city's sporting schedule, with races in 2007 and 2008. In 2009, the race will be relaunched as the Great North 10K Run, allowing male competitors to take part for the first time, on 12 July.

Notable residents

See also

 Sunderland's Boxing Day dip
 The North Dock Tufa
 List of important dates in the history of Sunderland
 The New Monkey

References

External links

 
Ports and harbours of Tyne and Wear
Port cities and towns in North East England
Port cities and towns of the North Sea
Populated coastal places in Tyne and Wear
Towns in Tyne and Wear
Unparished areas in Tyne and Wear
City of Sunderland